Jean Bretog, born in Saint-Laurent-de-Digne, was a 16th-century French playwright. He wrote a short tragedy titled Tragédie française à huit personnages (1571).

Modern edition 
 R. Reynolds-Cornell, Théâtre français de la Renaissance, 1st series, vol. 4 (1568-1573), Florence–Paris, Olschki-PUF, 1992, .

See also 
 French Renaissance literature

External links 
 Tragédie française à huit personnages at Gallica

16th-century French dramatists and playwrights